The 1912–13 season was the 42nd season of competitive football in England.

Overview
Sunderland won the First Division for the fifth time, with a record of 25–4–9; Aston Villa, finishing second, had fewer defeats, but a lot more draws: 19–12–7.

Blackburn Rovers won the Charity Shield for the first time in a close final (2–1) with Queens Park Rangers.

Aston Villa won the FA Cup Final against Sunderland (1–0) and obtained their fifth cup.

Notts County and Woolwich Arsenal were relegated to the Second Division; Preston North End and Burnley were promoted to the First Division.

Events
Lincoln City returned to the Football League once again, at the expense of Gainsborough Trinity.

Honours

Notes = Number in parentheses is the times that club has won that honour. * indicates new record for competition

League tables

First Division

Second Division

References